The following is a list of flags of Georgia.

National flag

President's flag

Military

Land Force

National Guard

Air force

Coast Guard and former Navy

Paramilitary

Border Police

Intelligence Service

Vexillology Associations

Self-Governing City Flags

Regional flags

Political flags

Religious flags

Historical flags

Other

Republic of Abkhazia

National flag

President's flag

Abkhazian Armed Forces

Navy

Historical flags

Republic of South Ossetia

National flag

See also

 Flag of Georgia (country)
 Coat of arms of Georgia (country)

References

External links

Georgia: Historical flags, 5th-18th centuries (crwflags.com)

 
Flags
Lists and galleries of flags
Flags